The following is a list of county routes in Burlington County in the U.S. state of New Jersey.  For more information on the county route system in New Jersey as a whole, including its history, see County routes in New Jersey.

500-series county routes
In addition to those listed below, the following 500-series county routes serve Burlington County:
CR 528, CR 530, CR 532, CR 534, CR 537, CR 541, CR 542, CR 543, CR 544, CR 545, CR 563

Other county routes

See also

References

 
Burlington